Lorenzo Renzi (Vicenza, 1939), Italian linguist and philologist.

Biography 
Lecturer of Romance philology at the Paduan Athenaeum, he has chaired the Società Linguistica Italiana.

He is author of several works in the field of linguistics.

Main works
 La lingua italiana oggi: un problema scolastico e sociale, a cura di Lorenzo Renzi e M. A. Cortelazzo, Bologna, Il Mulino, 1977.
 Grande Grammatica italiana di consultazione, a cura di L.Renzi, Giampaolo Salvi e Anna Cardinaletti, 3 voll., Bologna, Il Mulino, 1991.
 Le tendenze dell’italiano contemporaneo. Note sul cambiamento linguistico nel breve periodo, in “Studi di Lessicografia italiana”, XVII, 2000, pp. 279–319.
 Etimologia scientifica e etimologia retorica, in L'Accademia della Crusca per Giovanni Nencioni, Firenze, Le Lettere, 2002, pp. 465–482.
 Il cambiamento linguistico nell'italiano contemporaneo, in N. Maraschio e T. Poggi Salani (a cura di), Italia linguistica anno Mille, Italia linguistica anno Duemila, Roma, Bulzoni, 2003, pp. 37–52.
 Il controllo ortografico del computer come tutore della norma dell’italiano, in Gli italiani e la lingua, a cura di Franco Lo Piparo e Giovanni Ruffino, Palermo, Sellerio, 2005, pp. 199–208.
 Manuale di Linguistica e Filologia romanza, (con A. Andreose), Bologna, il Mulino, 2003.
 Grammatica dell’italiano antico, a cura di Giampaolo Salvi e Lorenzo Renzi, Bologna, il Mulino, 2010, 2 voll., pp. 1745.

Notes

1939 births
Living people
Writers from Rome
Romance philologists
Italian philologists
Linguists from Italy
Grammarians of Italian
Grammarians from Italy